DXWC (88.3 FM), broadcasting as Peace 88.3, is a radio station owned and operated by the AFP Western Mindanao Command through its 4th Civil Relations Group. Its studios are located inside the WesMinCom gymnasium, Camp General Basilio Navarro, Brgy. Upper Calarian, Zamboanga City.

References

Radio stations in Zamboanga City
Radio stations established in 2012
2012 establishments in the Philippines
Peace 88.3